Gladys Porter Zoo is a zoological and botanical park located in Brownsville, Texas, United States. The zoo officially opened on September 3, 1971, and currently averages over 424,000 visitors annually. It is the first zoo to have successfully bred the endangered Jentink's duiker (although none are currently in captivity in the US). It is also the birthplace of Harambe, the gorilla.

The zoo is named after Gladys Porter, the daughter of Earl C. Sams, former president of J. C. Penney. Porter, a wildlife enthusiast, helped to plan and stock the zoo, which was entirely funded by the Earl C. Sams Foundation. After its opening, the zoo was given to the city of Brownsville.

History

The zoo was planned, built, stocked, and given by the Earl C. Sams Foundation to the City of Brownsville. It opened on 3 September 1971. The first addition to its exhibits was the Herpetarium, which opened in April 1973. The zoo has been the single largest recipient from the foundation funds established by Sams.

The zoo published the first issue of its Zoo News (its official newsletter and now a quarterly publication) in January 1972. The naturalistic exhibits at the zoo won the 1979 Texas Building Branch of Associated                             General Contractors Outstanding Construction Award.

In 1978, the zoo launched its summer study programs on a trial basis with classes for children in grades 1 through 12. Although only four classes were taught that summer, the program has expanded over the years and now includes classes in the spring and fall as well as summer. The zoo also received accreditation from the Association of Zoos and Aquariums (AZA) in 1978.

In subsequent years, Orangutan Island was enlarged, the Herpetarium was expanded with a new aquatic wing, and many other exhibits as well as facilities such as the gift shop, offices, and concession stands were remodeled or added. Most of these projects were made possible by the zoo's annual Zoofari fundraisers.

In 1986, the zoo created an endowment fund with the help of matching grants from the Earl C. Sams (dollar for dollar up to $2 million) and the Lightner Sams Foundation (dollar for dollar up to $1 million). Income from this permanent endowment now ensures that the zoo can maintain and improve itself.

The Australian exhibit opened in February 1988 — the largest addition to the zoo since its opening. The Education department was also expanded in 1989 and a walk-through aviary (Zack's Aerie, made possible by private donations) was also opened.

Africa

Addax
African lion
African wild dog
Angolan black-and-white colobus
Black-and-white ruffed lemur
Blue crane
Bongo
Bontebok
Bushbuck
Chimpanzee
Common warthog
Dama gazelle
Dromedary camel
Grant’s zebra
Gray-crowned crane
Kori bustard
Kudu
Mandrill
Pygmy hippo
Radiated tortoise
Red ruffed lemur
Red-flanked duiker
Reticulated giraffe
Ring-tailed lemur
Serval
Southern ground-hornbill
Southern white rhinoceros
Western lowland gorilla
Yellow-backed duiker

Asia-Australia

Arabian oryx
Black swan
Edward’s pheasant
Gaur
Komodo dragon
Magpie goose
Müller’s gibbon
Nilgai
Philippine crocodile
Pileated gibbon
Rhinoceros hornbill
Saltwater crocodile
Siamang
Southern cassowary
Sumatran orangutan
Tawny frogmouth
Tiger

Asia-Australia (Indoor Exhibits)

Carpet python
Eastern blue-tongued skink
Matschie’s tree kangaroo
Northern greater galago (*)
Northern treeshrew
Seba’s short-tailed bat (**)
Short-beaked echidna
Sugar glider
Virginia opossum (**)
Western gray kangaroo
Yellow monitor

(*)=actually an African species
(**)=actually an American species

Herpetarium

Alligator snapping turtle
American alligator
Arabian sand boa
Asian giant toad
Axolotl
Black-spotted newt
Blue-spotted tree monitor
Brazilian salmon-pink bird-eating tarantula
Broad-banded copperhead
Brown recluse spider
Brown widow
Central American bushmaster
Chiapan beaded lizard
Common knob-tailed gecko
Common leopard gecko
Cuvier’s dwarf caiman
Desert hairy scorpion
Gaboon viper
Giant African bullfrog
Giant cave cockroach
Giant plated lizard
Giant vinegaroon
Gray-banded kingsnake
Gray’s monitor
Green iguana
Green tree python
Green tree skink
King cobra
Madagascar hissing cockroach
Malaysian blood python
Mandarin ratsnake
Mangshan pit viper
Mexican hognose snake
Mexican redknee tarantula
Mottled rock rattlesnake
Narrow-breasted snake-necked turtle
Narrow-bridged musk turtle
Neotropical ratsnake
Northern caiman lizard
Prehensile tailed skink
Red-eyed crocodile skink
Reticulated python
Rhinoceros rat snake
Ridge-tailed monitor
Rio Fuerte beaded lizard
Shingleback lizard
Slender glass lizard
Smoky jungle frog
Southern black widow
Southern house spider
Southwestern speckled rattlesnake
Sri Lankan pit viper
Striped bark scorpion
Tamaulipan milksnake
Tamaulipan rock rattlesnake
Taylor’s cantil
Texas brown tarantula
Texas coral snake
Texas indigo snake
Thai bamboo rat snake
Tiger rattlesnake
Trans-Pecos rat snake
Western diamondback rattlesnake
Western green mamba

Russell Aquatic Ecology Centre

Alligator gar
Atlantic needlefish
Atlantic sergeant major
Atlantic spadefish
Atlantic stingray
Atlantic tripletail
Axolotl
Bighead searobin
Black drum
Caribbean ocean surgeonfish
Common snook
Cownose ray
Diamondback terrapin
Flag-fin mojarra
Florida pompano
Giant Atlantic murex
Giant hermit crab
Gulf killifish
Gulf toadfish
Hardhead catfish
Island apple snail
Koi
Lined seahorse
Lionfish
Mangrove snapper
Northern brown shrimp
Northern white shrimp
Nurse shark
Peppermint shrimp
Pinfish
Red drum
Red eared slider turtle
Sheepshead
Southern marginalis moon jellyfish
Southern stingray
Spanish hogfish
Spotted gar
Striped mullet
Texas cichlid
Thin-stripe hermit crab
White mullet

Small World

Brazilian porcupine
Cairo spiny mouse
Cape porcupine
Cotton-headed tamarin
Eastern screech-owl
Golden-handed tamarin
Hoffmann’s two-toed sloth
Mantled howler monkey
Meerkat
Mongolian gerbil
Screaming hairy armadillo
White-faced saki

Small World Petting Zoo

Domestic ferret
Domestic goat
Domestic pig
Domestic rabbit

South Texas Butterfly Garden

Banded orange heliconian
Eastern giant swallowtail
Gulf fritillary
Julia heliconian
Monarch butterfly
Painted lady
Queen butterfly
Zebra longwing

South Texas Discovery Centre

Bullsnake
Cane toad
Desert millipede
Giant desert centipede
Great Plains skink
Gulf coast toad
Striped bark scorpion
Tiger salamander

Tropical America

Bald eagle
Black spider monkey
Blue-and-yellow macaw
Capybara
Caribbean flamingo
Chilean flamingo
Crested caracara
Cuban crocodile
Darwin Volcano giant tortoise
Great curassow
King vulture
Mexican spider monkey
Military macaw
Orinoco crocodile
Sandhill crane
Tufted capuchin

Tropical Free Flight Aviary

Black-throated magpie-jay
Blue-bellied roller
Chiloe wigeon
Golden pheasant
Plain chachalaca
Red-capped cardinal
Ringed teal
Roseate spoonbill
Scarlet ibis
Scarlet macaw
Trumpeter hornbill
Turquoise-browed motmot
Violet turaco

Un-Themed General Zoo Area American Animals

American black bear
Golden conure
Grand Cayman blue iguana
Great curassow
North American river otter
Peruvian thick-knee
Red-and-green macaw
Spectacled bear
Yellow-headed parrot

References

External links

Handbook of Texas Online: Gladys Sams Porter
Handbook of Texas Online: Gladys Porter Zoo

Zoos in Texas
Buildings and structures in Brownsville, Texas
Tourist attractions in Cameron County, Texas
Protected areas of Cameron County, Texas
Zoos established in 1971